Saidabad-e Shafipur (also Romanized as Saʿīdābād-e Shafīʿpūr and Saʿeedābād-e Shafīʿpūr) is a village in Kabutar Khan Rural District, in the Central District of Rafsanjan County, Kerman Province, Iran. At the 2006 census, its population was 345, in 72 families.

References 

Populated places in Rafsanjan County